The Diocese of Tacuarembó is a Latin Church ecclesiastical territory or diocese of the Catholic Church in Uruguay. It is a suffragan diocese in the ecclesiastical province (covering all Uruguay) of the metropolitan Archdiocese of Montevideo.

History
The diocese was created in 1960, from the Diocese of Florida and is a suffragan of the Archdiocese of Montevideo. It covers the Departments of Tacuarembó and Rivera. Its see is at the Cathedral of Tacuarembó.

Ordinaries
Carlos Parteli Keller † (3 Nov 1960 Appointed – 26 February 1966 Appointed, Coadjutor Archbishop of Montevideo) 
Miguel Balaguer † (26 Feb 1966 Appointed – 28 January 1983 Resigned) 
Daniel Gil Zorrilla, S.J. (28 Jan 1983 Appointed – 8 March 1989 Appointed, Bishop of Salto) 
Julio César Bonino † (20 Dec 1989 Appointed – 8 August 2017 Died in office)
 Pedro Ignacio Wolcan Olano, (from 19 June 2018)

See also
List of churches in the Diocese of Tacuarembó
List of Roman Catholic dioceses in Uruguay

External links
 

Religion in Tacuarembó Department
Religion in Rivera Department
Tacuarembo
Tacuarembo
Christian organizations established in 1960
1960 establishments in Uruguay
Tacuarembo